Kai Feng (1906 – March 23, 1955), born He Kequan, was a Chinese Communist revolutionary and politician. He was one of the 28 Bolsheviks trained in Moscow. He was the eighth president of the Party School of the Central Committee of the Communist Party of China, the highest training center for party workers and leaders. Kai served as president from 1953 to 1954.
 

Chinese Communist Party politicians from Jiangxi
1906 births
1955 deaths
Politicians from Pingxiang
Republic of China politicians from Jiangxi
People's Republic of China politicians from Jiangxi
Moscow Sun Yat-sen University alumni
National Wuhan University alumni